Serasan is a district in the Natuna Regency, Riau Islands, Indonesia. There are 34 named islands, 4 inhabited islands and 7 villages in the district.

Villages
There are 7 villages in the Serasan District. 5 villages use a spring for water, 1 uses a well, and 1 uses refillable water. All 7 villages use kerosene for cooking, and there are 1,566 families using electricity. The district is almost all Muslim, with 98.75% of the population practicing Islam, and the rest being Christian or Buddhist. There are 8 mosques in the district, with 1 in each village and 2 in Serasan. There are also 6 musallas, 1 in Jermalik and Tanjung Balau, and 2 in Pangkalan and Serasan. There are 17 sports facilities in the district. Each town has a volleyball court, 5 have a soccer field, 4 have a table tennis facility, and there is also 1 futsal, billiards, badminton and court tennis facility in the district. There are 3 lodges in the district, 3 in Serasan and 1 in Tanjung Setelung. There is public transportation in 6 villages, although there are no fixed routes. All villages also have asphalt or concrete roads open throughout the year. There is an operational post office in the village of Serasan with the postal code of 29781. There are 4 cell towers in the district, and at least 1 communication service operators serves the villages. All but 2 villages have 4G LTE, with Tanjung Balau and Pangkalan only having 2.5G. There are 8 restaurants on the island, with all but 1 in Serasan.

Education

History
On March 6, 2023, landslides caused by heavy rains on the islands, killed 30 and left many missing.

References

 
Populated places in Indonesia
Islands of Indonesia